The Dutch naval brig Meermin was built at Flushing; the Zeeland Admiralty purchased her in 1784. The British Royal Navy seized her in 1796. The Royal Navy named her HMS Miermen and registered but never commissioned her; it sold her in 1801.

On 9 March 1793 Meerman, of Zeeland, Captain Cornelis Schalk, captured Frende Suskene, John Thomsen, master, off Walcheren. Frende Suskene, of and from Christiansand, was on her way to Ostend or Calais with deals, balks, and users. Lieutenant S. Oudekesk Pool brought her into Dover the next day. 

In 1795 at the time of the Batavian Revolution the British Admiralty sent a messenger to Plymouth on 20 January 1795 to the admiral there to detain all Dutch vessels in port. There were six naval vessels, Meerman among them. (Initial British press reports referred to her as Steerman.) There were also six homeward-bound East Indiamen, three outward-bound East Indiamen, and some 60 to 70 other merchant vessels. Vice Admiral Sir Richard Onslow and the British Royal Navy took possession 4 March 1796. The crews were removed from their vessels and taken to prison ships. In September orders arrived at Plyouth that the Dutch naval vessels be equipped for immediate service. 

The Navy named and registered Miermen on 25 October 1796, but never commissioned her. The "Principal officers and commissioners of His Majesty's Navy" offered Miermen for sale on 31 August 1801. She sold on that day for £160.

Notes

Citations

References
 
 

1784 ships
Ships built in Vlissingen
Captured ships
Brigs of the Royal Navy